Eonecrophorus tenuicornis is a species of carrion beetle found in eastern Nepal. First described scientifically by Yoshihiko Kurosawa in 1985, E. tenuicornis is the only species in the genus Eonecrophorus.

References

Silphidae
Insects of Nepal
Beetles described in 1985